Parah Ardeshir-e Jadid (also Romanized as Pārah Ardeshīr-e Jadīd; also known as Pārah Ardeshīr) is a village in Bahmai-ye Garmsiri-ye Shomali Rural District, Bahmai-ye Garmsiri District, Bahmai County, Kohgiluyeh and Boyer-Ahmad Province, Iran. At the 2006 census, its population was 123, in 29 families.

References 

Populated places in Bahmai County